The FRIENDSHIP Act of 1993 was enacted as a law of the United States enhancing prior statutory provisions which govern international relations between the former Republics of the Soviet Union and United States during the Cold War. The Act of Congress reformed United States statutes related to:
 Armament export controls as related to military technology transfer limitations
 Continental cultural and educational exchange
 Cooperative foreign trade relations
 Diplomatic relations with foreign allies
 Global environmental shifts
 Immigration and nationality requirements
 International products exports
 Societal propagandization as related to multicultural social ideology

The H.R. 3000 legislation was passed by the 103rd United States Congressional session and enacted into law by the 42nd President of the United States Bill Clinton on December 17, 1993.

Titles of the Act
The 1993 Act was penned as nine titles establishing purposeful foreign relations as related to the development of emerging democracies and improved multinational partnerships.

Title I: Policy of Friendship and Cooperation
Statement of purpose
Findings
Statutory provisions that have been applicable to the Soviet Union.

Title II: Trade and Business Relations
Policy under Export Administration Act
Representation of countries of Eastern Europe and the Independent States of the former Soviet Union in legal commercial transactions
Procedures regarding transfers of certain Department of Defense-funded items
Soviet slave labor

Title III: Cultural, Educational, and Other Exchange Programs
Mutual Educational and Cultural Exchange Act of 1961
Soviet-Eastern European research and training
Fascell Fellowship Act
Board for International Broadcasting Act
Scholarship programs for developing countries
Report on Soviet participants in certain exchange programs

Title IV: Arms Control
Arms Control and Disarmament Act
Arms Export Control Act
Annual reports on arms control matters
United States/Soviet direct communication link

Title V: Diplomatic Relations
Personnel levels and limitations
Other provisions related to operation of consulates and embassies
Foreign Service Buildings Act

Title VI: Oceans and the Environment
Arctic Research and Policy Act
Fur seal management
Global climate protection

Title VII: Regional and General Diplomatic Issues
United Nations assessments
Soviet occupation of Afghanistan
Angola
Self determination of the people from the Baltic States
Obsolete references in Foreign Assistance Act
Review of United States policy toward the Soviet Union

Title VIII: Internal Security; Worldwide Communist Conspiracy
Civil defense
Report on Soviet press manipulation in the United States
Subversive Activities Control Act
Report on Soviet and international communist behavior

Title IX: Miscellaneous
Ballistic missile tests near Hawaii
Nondelivery of international mail
State-sponsored harassment of religious groups
Murder of Major Arthur D. Nicholson
Monument to honor victims of communism

See also

Arctic policy of the United States
Communist Control Act of 1954
Containment
Former Soviet Union Demilitarization Act of 1992
Freedom Support Act
Helsinki Accords
Korean Air Lines Flight 007
Mount Alto Embassy Site
National Captive Nations Committee
North Pacific Fur Seal Convention of 1911
Omnibus Foreign Trade and Competitiveness Act
Partnership for Peace
Samantha Smith
Soviet anti-religious legislation
Soviet Nuclear Threat Reduction Act of 1991
Victims of Communism Memorial Foundation
World Trade Organization

References

External links
 
 
 
 
 
 

1993 in international relations
103rd United States Congress
Cold War
Cold War history of the United States
Soviet Union–United States relations
United States foreign relations legislation